Teenage Mutant Ninja Turtles: The Score is the score to the 2014 film Teenage Mutant Ninja Turtles, and was composed by Brian Tyler. The soundtrack was released by Atlantic Records on August 5, 2014. It also includes a song featured in the film credits, "Shell Shocked", performed by  rappers Juicy J and Wiz Khalifa and singer Ty Dolla Sign, with an electronic music backing by Tyler (credited as Madsonik) and Kill the Noise. The score, just like the movie, was critically panned by critics, with the majority of the criticism aimed at its lack of variety, repetitiveness and overuse of the Turtles' main theme.

Track listing

Chart performance

References

2010s film soundtrack albums
2014 soundtrack albums
Atlantic Records soundtracks
Score
Teenage Mutant Ninja Turtles (2014 film series)
Brian Tyler soundtracks